Arbat (also Romanized as Arbaţ; also known as Arbad) is a village in Gonbar Rural District, in the Central District of Osku County, East Azerbaijan Province, Iran. At the 2006 census, its population was 442, in 112 families.

References 

Populated places in Osku County